JDC Records was an important record distributor during the golden years of dance music (1976–1990).  It was originally located in San Pedro, California and owned by Jim and Dale Callon. The company name came from their initials, JDC.  They distributed world-wide and carried many independent labels. JDC was known for their "JDC Mixers." Popular DJs such as DJ Pebo would take records from the catalog and create a non-stop dance mix.  JDC also had a retail record store in San Pedro.  It was managed by Rudy Benavides.

Jim Callon worked closely on production with his UCLA classmate, Charles Lamont of Barking Dog Studios.

JDC was also a record label which included a sub-label of hip-hop called Dunk Yer Funk Records which released the electrofunk classic "Velocity, Speed and Force" by VSF (which was produced by J-vibe).

Today, JDC operates out of San Pedro, California, as a one-stop distribution company for all genres of music, specializing in vinyl records, but also offering CDs and cassette tapes. A new retail shop also opened in San Pedro in 2016, in front of the distribution warehouse.

Releases
 JDC 0027  Unknown Artist L.A. Party Mix (12")
 JDC 0028  Bobby Davenport - Time (Has Come Today) (12")
 JDC 0029  Rofo - Flashlight On A Disconight (12")
 JDC 0030  Precious - Taboo (12")
 JDC 0032  Various The JDC Mixer - 7 Years Of Disco / Dance Music (12")
 JDC 0033  Victor & The Glove - Breakmixer (Part 1) (12", S/Sided)
 JDC 0033  Victor & The Glove - Breakmixer (Part 2) (12", S/Sided)
 JDC 0034  Knights Of The Turntables - Techno Scratch (12")
 JDC 0035  Rofo You've Got To Move It On (12")
 JDC 0036  Tapps - My Forbidden Lover (12")
 JDC 0038  Tyrants in Therapy - Three People (Nude Below The Waist) (12")
 JDC 0041  Knights Of The Turntables - Fresh Mess (12")
 JDC 0042  Purple Flash - We Can Make It (12")
 JDC 0043  Samantha Gilles - Feel It (12")
 JDC 0044  The Glass Family featuring Taka Boom - The Stars Are Out (12") 
 JDC 0045  Various - The JDC Mixer Volume 2 (12")
 JDC 0046  Jessica Williams - They Call Me Queen Of Fools (12")
 JDC 0047  Arpeggio  / French Kiss - Love & Desire / Panic (12")
 JDC 0049  Venus - One Shot Lover (12")
 JDC 0050  Soif De La Vie - Goddess Of Love (12")
 JDC 0051  Charity / Carlos Perez - Sweet Conversation / Las Manos Quietas (12")
 JDC 0052  Igor RX-15 - Nuthin' But Beats (12")
 JDC 0054  Tyrants In Therapy - Paint It Pink (12")
 JDC 0055  Various - The JDC Mixer Volume 3 (12")
 JDC 0056  J.D. Hall - #1 Lover (12")
 JDC 0058  Cerrone - Trippin On The Moon (12")
 JDC 0059  Ferrara - Love Attack (12")
 JDC 0060  Rosebud - Have A Cigar (12")
 JDC 0061  People Like Us - Midnight Lover (12")
 JDC 0062  Finzy Kontini - Cha Cha Cha (12")
 JDC 0063  Latin Lover - Cassanova Action (12")
 JDC 0064  Antonio Rodriguez / Dee D. Jackson - La Bamba / S.O.S. (Love To The Rescue) (12")
 JDC 0065  Angie Gold  - Eat You Up (12")
 JDC 0066  Patrick Cowley - Right On Target (12")
 JDC 0067  Various - The JDC Mixer Volume 4 (12")
 JDC 0068  Phaeax - Talk About (12")
 JDC 0069  Santa Esmeralda - Another Cha Cha/Cha Cha Suite (12")
 JDC 0071  Telex - Moskow Diskow (12")
 JDC 0073  Astaire - Fire Me Up (12")
 JDC 0074  Colleen - Soft Cafe (12")
 JDC 0076  Venus - Hot Sun On Video (12")
 JDC 0079  Tyrants In Therapy - Too Tuff To Cry (12")
 JDC 0082  Sabby - Friday Night (12")
 JDC 0085  Tapps - Don't Pretend To Know (12")
 JDC 0087  Various - The JDC Mixer Vol. 6 (12")
 JDC 0088  Persuasion - Take Me Now (12")
 JDC 0089  Dharma - Plastic Doll (12")
 JDC 0090  Psychic Interface - Body To Body (12")
 JDC 0091  Bianca - One More Time (12")
 JDC 0092  Trilogy - Not Love (12")
 JDC 0093  Boytronic - You / Bryllyant (12", Single)
 JDC 0094  Shy Rose - I Cry For You (12")
 JDC 0096  Scotch - Money Runner (Remix) (12")
 JDC 0097  MC Miker G. & DJ Sven - Holiday Rap (12")
 JDC 0099  Tyrants In Therapy - Crazy Dreams (12")
 JDC 0100  Tantra - The Hills Of Katmandu (The Patrick Cowley Megamix) (12")
 JDC 0101  Man 2 Man Meets Jessica Williams - These Boots Are Made For Walking (12")
 JDC 0102  Michael Bow - One Shot So Hot (12")
 JDC 0103  Various - The JDC Mixer Volume 7 (12", Mix)
 JDC 0106  The Tyrant Michael - Call Of The Wild (12")
 JDC 0107  Digital Emotion - Get Up "Action!" (12")
 JDC 0108  Bianca - Midnight Lover (12")
 JDC 0109  Various - The JDC Mixer Volume VIII (12")
 JDC 0110  Rofo - Rofo's Theme (12")
 JDC 0112  David Storrs - Dancing On The Planet (12")
 JDC 0113  Jonny Chingas - Automatic Lover (12")
 JDC 0114  Bollock Brothers -  The Harley David / Son Of A Bitch (12")
 JDC 0115  Divine Sounds - What People Do For Money (12")
 JDC 0116  Sexual Harassment - I Need a Freak (12")
 JDC 0117  Various - The JDC Mixer No. 9 (12")
 JDC 1001  Ice-T - Coldest Rap / Cold Wind Madness (12")
 JDC 12-1  Glass Family - The Crazy / Disco Concerto (12")
 JDC 12-11  Ann Joy - Love Now Hurt Later (12")
 JDC 12-12  Little Casper and The MX's - The Ultimate Warlord (12")
 JDC 12-4  Two Man Sound - Que Tal America (12")
 JDC 12-6  Taka Boom - Bring It Back (12")
 JDC 12-7  Fever - Standing In The Shadows Of Love (Remix) (12")
 JDC 12-8  Two Man Sound - La Musica Latina (12")
 JDC 12-9  'Lectric Funk - Shanghaied (12")
 JDC 2003  Captain Rapp - Bad Times (I Can't Stand It) (12")
 JDC 2018  Poetry 'N' Motion - Killer Dayton's (12", RP)
 JDC 2023  Stereo MD & DJ Weasul - Don't Make Me Mad (12")
 JDC 3451-2  Bollock Brothers - The Harley David / Son Of A Bitch (CD, Maxi)
 JDC 3452-2  Eddie Hazel Jams From The Heart (CD)
 JDC 429  Glass Family - The Crazy (7")
 JDC 62177  Glass Family - The Mr DJ, You Know How To Make Me Dance (LP)
 JDC/DOM-002  Tavares - C'est La Vie (12")
 M3-12  Glass Family - The  Crazy / Disco Concerto (12")
 P 20584  Vaughan Mason & Crew / Young & Company - Bounce, Rock, Skate, Roll / I Like (What You're Doing To Me) (12")

References

External links
 

American record labels
Hip hop record labels
Record labels based in California
Record labels established in 1978
Companies based in Los Angeles